Quşçu Ayrım is a village in the Qazakh District of Azerbaijan.  The name signifies the presence of Ayrums in the vicinity at some point in the past.

References 

Populated places in Qazax District